Silverstripe CMS is a free and open source content management system (CMS) and framework for creating and maintaining websites and web applications. It provides an out of the box web-based administration panel that enables users to make modifications to parts of the website, which includes a WYSIWYG website editor. The core of the software is Silverstripe Framework, a PHP Web application framework.

Silverstripe CMS is released under the terms of the BSD License.

Software design 
Silverstripe CMS separates the roles of:
 content authors (who get a rich (AJAX) web-based user interface that omits technical jargon); and
 website designers/developers (who write code: HTML, CSS, JavaScript, and PHP)

This contrasts with CMS products which allow technical website development tasks to be performed within a GUI, and also contrasts with programming frameworks which offer no out-of-the-box content authoring application. The Silverstripe CMS approach allegedly removes complexity for content authors, and offers more flexibility to developers.

The core of Silverstripe CMS is named Silverstripe Framework (formerly referred to as "Sapphire"). As with the rest of the platform, it is written in PHP (5.3), and takes advantage of its object-oriented design capabilities such as name-spacing. The Silverstripe Framework provides website developers a framework to build and extend websites based on modern programming techniques including the model-view-controller  pattern and object-relational mapper.

Silverstripe CMS generates markup using a custom template-language based on W3C HTML5 that offers simple placeholders and conditional logic. Silverstripe CMS is extensible through modules, widgets, themes and code customization.

Features 

Notable features of the Silverstripe CMS include:
 Out-of-the-box template, supporting responsive design (works on smartphones, tablets, and desktop computers)
 An extensible web application interface
 Rich-text editing based on a modified version of TinyMCE
 Quick embedding of videos and other resources from websites like YouTube, slideshare, etc. (using oEmbed)
 Drag-and-drop tree-based navigation structure
 Custom output markup and table-free default styles (including HTML5 and mobile support)
 Work-flow management: Draft/Published separation through content staging, document revision control/rollback with 'compare' functionality
 Configurable security/permissions model (role-based)
 Data object model, database generation through object-relational mapping, suite of customizable data input controls.
 asset management, image resizing, drag&drop images from OS desktop to upload.
 Multiple templates per page
 Search engine friendly URLs, metadata management, XML site map generation
 Full text search and RSS feeds
 Optimizations for heavy loads (full and part-template caching)
 Internationalization/Languages: Silverstripe CMS supports multiple-language content. UTF-8 and the internationalization of character sets are supported. The CMS is available in many languages, including English, French, German, Spanish, and Chinese.
 Hierarchical URLs
 Cross-platform: OS (Linux, Windows, Mac), Web server (Apache, IIS), Database (MySQL, PostgreSQL, Microsoft SQL Server fully supported; SQLite and Oracle Database have limited support.)

Notable features of upcoming releases of Silverstripe CMS include:
 Additional administration UI (e.g. web-interface based installation of modules, widgets)
 Complete transition to jQuery library (currently uses jQuery with a mixture of older JavaScript frameworks.)
 Site-wide widgets

Common CMS features not currently available in Silverstripe CMS include:
 In-place page editing
 Web interface based installation of modules, widgets or themes
 Web interface based customization of themes
 Automated cache management/ORM refresh

Modules, widgets, and themes 
Modules can be used to extend the core functionality of Silverstripe CMS. Some existing modules include: Blog, Advanced Workflow Management, eCommerce, Forum, and LDAP/OpenID authentication. Modules are available from the Silverstripe CMS modules repository, which as of October 2022, lists over 3000 modules.

Silverstripe CMS Widgets are small pieces of functionality that can be drag-and-dropped into Silverstripe CMS modules (notably the blog module). Examples of widgets include: tag clouds, Flickr photos, or word of the day. Widgets are a relatively less-used aspect of the platform. As of August 2012, there are 96 widgets.

The Silverstripe CMS themes directory provides a number of community-contributed, freely available themes (114 as of October 2022).

Modules, widgets, and themes are all available as free downloads under the BSD license, and the majority of them are community contributed.

Software requirements 
Silverstripe CMS is a web application, requiring a compatible web server and SQL database. As of version 4.12., the requirements for Silverstripe CMS are as follows:
 Apache v2.4, Lighttpd, Nginx or Microsoft IIS 7.x+ (A URL Rewriter is required. As of 2.4.0 IIS 7 URL rewriting is supported out of the box)
 MySQL v5.6.X+, Microsoft SQL Server (community maintained), PostgreSQL (community maintained), SQLite3 (community maintained) and Oracle Database (experimental)
 PHP 7.4+ with PHP extensions: ctype, dom, fileinfo, hash, intl, mbstring, session, simplexml, tokenizer and xml. The gd or imagick extension for image manipulation and a extension for a database connector is also required.

Documentation 
Silverstripe CMS is released under the terms of the BSD License. Documentation is available for CMS users and website developers. An online demonstration of the CMS is available as an interactive demo.
Two technical reference books on Silverstripe CMS are available in English and one in German.

Recognition

Awards 
 Winner Packtpub Most Promising CMS Award 2008, $2000 prize. Then was First Runner up, "Best Overall CMS" in 2009. Also Pact Publishing CMS Awards finalist in 2007.
 Winner in New Zealand Open Source Awards for October 2008 and in 2010.
 Most promising finalists in the 2007 Open Source CMS Awards
 Finalists in the New Zealand Open Source Awards for October 2007
 Hi-tech Awards - Finalist, Emerging Technology Company of the Year in 2017
 Hi-tech Awards - Winner, Best Technology Solution for the Public Sector in 2016
 ALGIM Conference - Winner, Best All Round Exhibitor in 2015 and in 2014
 Internet Industry Awards 2009 - The Positive Societal Impact Award for “The Lowdown” website. This site was also a finalist in 2008 for the TUANZ Innovation Awards.
 ALGIM Web Award - Winner, "Best Redevelopment Website, People’s Choice" for the Gisborne District Council website in 2009.
 2009 World Summit Awards - Winner for the National Broadband Map, a site created for the State Services Commission
 11th Annual Wellington Gold Awards - Finalist in 2009 and 2007
 2008 ComputerWorld Excellence Awards - Finalist, "Innovative Use of IT"

Reviews and articles

Version 3.0 (latest as of November 2012) 
 SSBits (10 September 2012)

Version 2 
 SilverStripe Review (3 April 2009)
 Microsoft Case Study (17 March 2009)
 ReadWriteWeb, 14 September 2007
 Interview on New Zealand Television Show, 1 May 2007, (Video)
 Hiveminds Magazine, 15 March 2007

See also 

 Content management system
 List of content management systems

References

External links 
 Silverstripe CMS open source project and community website
 Online demonstration website
 Official help documentation
 Community forums
 Developer documentation wiki
 Public bug tracker, feature requests, patches, roadmap, changelog/timeline
 Silverstripe website
 Silverstripe CMS and Sapphire CMF API documentation

Free content management systems
Free software programmed in PHP
PHP frameworks
Software using the BSD license
Web frameworks
Software companies of New Zealand